Jovan Hristić (Serbian Cyrillic: Јован Христић; Belgrade, Serbia, Kingdom of Yugoslavia, 26 August 1933 - Sremska Kamenica, Serbia, 20 June 2002) was a Serbian poet, playwright, essayist, literary and theater critic, translator, editor of Literature, Danas and editor at IRO Nolit.

Biography
Jovan Hristić was born on 26 August 1933 in Belgrade.
He graduated from the Second Men's Gymnasium, together with Slobodan Selenić. He studied architecture and philosophy. He graduated from the Faculty of Philosophy in 1958. He was a full professor at the Faculty of Dramatic Arts and has been teaching dramaturgy to all generations since 1967.

He is an advocate of modern Serbian lyrics; in dramas, he tries to speak through well-known characters from the classics about the eternal problems that plague modern man; in the essay, he examines modern phenomena and forms in literature and art.

He is the winner of two Sterija Awards for Drama, Sterija Awards for Theatrology, Isidora Sekulic Award for Criticism, Djordje Jovanovic Award for Criticism, Milan Rakic Award, Pavle Bihalji Bookstore Award for Best Poetry Book of the Year 1993, Nolit, Borbina and Vinaver awards. In August 2001, he received the "Stjepan Mitrov Ljubiša International Award".

He died in Sremska Kamenica on June 20, 2002.

Jovan Hristić was the great-grandson of Filip Hristić, named after his son Jovan Hristić.

Works
Poetry books:
The Ulysses Diary (1954)
Poems 1952-1959 (1959)
Alexandrian School (1963)
Old and new songs (1988)
New and latest songs (1993)
Collected Poems (1996),
Collected Poems (2002)
U tavni čas - posthumno (2003)

Drama:
Clean Hands (1961)
Orestes (1961)
Savonarola and his friends (1965)
Seven: Today (1968)
Terrace (1972)

Books of criticism, study and review:
Poetry and the Critique of Poetry (1957)
Poetry and Philosophy (1964)
Forms of Modern Literature (1968)
Theater, Theater (1977)
Chekhov, playwright (1981)
Theater, Theater II (1982)
Drama Studies (1986)
Theatre Papers (1992)
Essays (1994)
Theater Papers II (1996)
About tragedy (1998)
On the Search for Theater (2002)
Selected Essays - Posthumous (2005)

Critical prose:
Professor of Mathematics and Other Essays (1988)
Professor of Mathematics and Other Essays (1997)
Terrace on two seas - posthumously (2002)

References

Sources
Marko Magarašević, "Lights of Literature", Belgrade, Idea, 1991.
Jovan Ćirilov, "Playwrights, My Contemporaries: Portraits", Novi Sad, Sterijino pozorje, 1989.
Radomir Putnik, "Čitajući iznova: ogledi iz dramaturgije i teatrologije," Novi Sad, Sterijino pozorje, 1990.
Slobodan Rakitić, "Poet Jovan Hristić", Književne novine, year 43, no. 790. pp. 14
Petar Milosavljević, "Tradition and Avant-Garde", Novi Sad, Matica srpska, 1968.
Mihajlo Pantić, "Man is not alone in his feelings", Književne novine, year 42, no. 779. pp. 12-13
Gordan M. Maričić, "Antički motivi u dramama Jovana Hristića i Velimira Lukića", Ph.D. thesis, Belgrade, 1999.

External links 

 Article about Jovan Hristić in time
 Interview in NIN
 Translated songs

20th-century Serbian poets
People from Belgrade
People from Novi Sad

1933 births
2002 deaths